Lymphocryptovirus is a genus of viruses in the order Herpesvirales, in the family Herpesviridae, in the subfamily Gammaherpesvirinae. This genus includes the human-infecting Human gammaherpesvirus 4 (Epstein–Barr virus), as well as viruses that infect both Old World monkeys and New World monkeys. Other names for the Lymphocryptovirus genus include Lymphocryptoviridae (suffix -viridae implying family rank, although this is not the accepted taxonomy) and gamma-1 herpesviruses. There are nine species in this genus. Diseases associated with this genus include: mononucleosis, Burkitt's lymphoma, and nasopharyngeal carcinoma.

Species 
The genus consists of the following nine species:

 Callitrichine gammaherpesvirus 3
 Cercopithecine gammaherpesvirus 14
 Gorilline gammaherpesvirus 1
 Human gammaherpesvirus 4
 Macacine gammaherpesvirus 4
 Macacine gammaherpesvirus 10
 Panine gammaherpesvirus 1
 Papiine gammaherpesvirus 1
 Pongine gammaherpesvirus 2

Structure 
Viruses in Lymphocryptovirus are enveloped, with icosahedral, spherical to pleomorphic, and round geometries, and T=16 symmetry. The diameter is around 150-200 nm. Genomes are linear and non-segmented, around 180kb in length.

Life cycle 
Viral replication is nuclear, and is lysogenic. Entry into the host cell is achieved by attachment of the viral glycoproteins to host receptors, which mediates endocytosis. Replication follows the dsDNA bidirectional replication model. DNA-templated transcription, with some alternative splicing mechanism is the method of transcription. The virus exits the host cell by nuclear egress, and  budding.
Human and  mammals serve as the natural host. Transmission routes are zoonosis, bite, contact, and saliva.

References

External links

 Viralzone: Lymphocryptovirus
 ICTV

Gammaherpesvirinae
Virus genera